Mabo is an Australian docudrama TV film, released in 2012, which relates the successful legal battle waged by Torres Strait Islander man Eddie Koiki Mabo to bring about native land title legislation in Australia.

Synopsis
Mabo tells the story of one of Australia's national heroes - Eddie Koiki Mabo, the Torres Strait Islander man who left school at age 15, yet spearheaded the High Court challenge that overthrew the fiction of terra nullius.

Cast 
Jimi Bani as Eddie Mabo
Gedor Zaro as Young Eddie 
Deborah Mailman as Bonita Mabo (née Neehow)
Ewen Leslie as Bryan Keon-Cohen
Colin Friels as Justice Moynahan 
Miranda Otto as Margaret White
Tom Budge as Greg McIntyre
Felix Williamson as Ron Castan
Leon Ford as Henry Reynolds
Lasarus Ratuere as Malcolm Mabo
Damien Garvey as Conroy
Heath Bergerson as Davy
Miranda Tapsell as Davy’s wife
Robyn Moore as Barbara Hocking
Charles Passi as Benny Mabo
Rob Carlton as Paddy Kilkoran
Chris Bartholemew as Townsville Hotel Barman 
Daniel Murphy as Doctor
Joseph J. U. Taylor as Bob Katter
Matthew Whittet as Noel Loos
Jeremy Ambrum as Donita’s relative
Monette Lee as Justice Mary Gaudron

Production
The film was written by Sue Smith, directed by Rachel Perkins and produced by Darren Dale and Miranda Dear, all of Blackfella Films, with the assistance of  the ABC and SBS. It was filmed at Mer Island in the Torres Strait, Townsville, Brisbane and Canberra.

Release
It premiered at the Sydney Film Festival 2012.

References

External links 
 From the pitch to the screen: Mabo at the Australian Broadcasting Corporation, 26 June 2012
 

2012 films
Films about Aboriginal Australians
APRA Award winners
Australian biographical films
Australian documentary television films
Torres Strait Islands culture
Films directed by Rachel Perkins
Films set in Queensland
Films set in Brisbane
Films set in the 20th century
Films set in the 1950s
Films set in the 1960s
Films set in the 1970s
Films set in the 1980s
Films set in the 1990s
Films set in 1956
Films set in 1959
Films set in 1967
Films set in 1973
Films set in 1981
Films set in 1986
Films set in 1988
Films set in 1990
2010s English-language films